Rustem Igor Gamow (November 4, 1935 in Georgetown, D.C. – April 15, 2021) was a microbiology professor at the University of Colorado and inventor. His best known inventions included the Gamow bag and the Shallow Underwater Breathing Apparatus.  He was fired from CU in 2004 following sexual harassment and assault charges.

Early life and education
Rustem Igor Gamow was the son of Russian émigré physicists George Gamow and Lyubov Vokhmintseva "Rho" Gamow.  Finishing high school at age 17, he joined the National Ballet Company.  He worked breaking horses, delivering packages by motorcycle, and teaching karate before enrolling at the University of Colorado in 1958, where his father taught. Igor Gamow received a B.A. and M.S. in biology, and a Ph.D. in biophysics, all at University of Colorado.

Research 
Gamow worked on Phycomyces blakesleeanus during postdoctoral research under Max Delbrück at Caltech. At CU-Boulder, he did Phycomyces research for over twenty years, mainly on the avoidance and anemotropic responses, helical growth, and cell-wall mechanical properties. He also studied the infrared-detectors of the Boa constrictor.

An avid outdoorsman, Gamow developed a number of inventions for safety in outdoor activities.  His first important one, patented in 1990, was the Gamow bag enabling mountain climbers to avoid altitude sickness by raising the surrounding pressure.  Sir Edmund Hillary, the first expedition leader to summit Mount Everest, wrote him in congratulation.  Another was the Shallow Underwater Breathing Apparatus ("SUBA"), a pressurized snorkel system permitting swimmers to breathe easily as deep as ten feet under water.

Igor Gamow also worked in bionics, on an orthopedic knee brace that stores energy within a spring from the hamstring and redirects it to the quadriceps.

Patents 
  — Hyperbaric chamber
  — Hyperbaric chamber
  — Underwater breathing apparatus
  — Hyperbaric chamber closure means
  — Shoe and foot prosthesis with a coupled spring system
  — Hyperbaric chamber and exercise environment
  — Hypobaric sleeping chamber
  — In-line skate walking guard
  — Shoe and foot prosthesis with bending beam spring structures
  — Underwater breathing apparatus with pressurized snorkel
  — Shoe and foot prosthesis with bending beam spring structures

Termination at CU 

In 2002, a former assistant of Gamow's filed a lawsuit against the university alleging sexual harassment and sexual assault from seven women. After the lawsuit was filed, the university began to take steps to terminate Gamow. In 2004 the CU Board of Regents unanimously upheld the recommendation to dismiss Gamow for "moral turpitude".  Gamow filed a lawsuit against CU in an attempt to be reinstated.

In May 2006, CU lost a lawsuit that had been filed by Gamow's former assistant and was ordered to pay her $285,000 plus attorney's fees.

In September 2011, Gamow released an open letter addressing some misconceptions about events leading to his termination from the University of Colorado.

References

External links
Gamow's personal homepage
MIT inventor of the week August 23, 2003
ExplorerWeb profile and interview August 18, 2006
Fear and Groping In Boulder Denver Westworld June 1996 article, this article contains three sexual harassment stories, scan down to the heading 'Freshman Disorientation' for the one referencing Igor Gamow
Isn't It Romantic Denver Westworld July 1996 article, documents an accusation of sexual harassment that was not upheld by university review despite finding the accuser 'credible' and recommending that Igor Gamow take four hours of sexual-harassment training
 The Smutty Professor Denver Westword May 2006 article on Gamow's problem with sexual harassment that resulted in his dismissal from the University of Colorado 
 Open Letter to the Editor of the Boulder Daily Camera  Igor Gamow, January 2007
Obituary - 2021

1935 births
2021 deaths
American chemical engineers
University of Colorado faculty
University of Colorado Boulder faculty
American inventors
People from Georgetown (Washington, D.C.)